Matthew Waltz (born October 6, 1989) is a retired American professional stock car racing driver. He competed in the NASCAR Xfinity Series, driving for Derrike Cope Racing and Obaika Racing, and raced late models at Langley Speedway, winning the track championship in 2017.

Racing career

Late models 
Waltz grew up racing Late Model cars on his home track Langley Speedway, which he shared with fellow NASCAR driver Brandon Gdovic. He took second in the Denny Hamlin Short Track Shootout in 2014, the same year he won twelve races at Langley. Returning to Langley in 2017, Waltz claimed his first late model championship at the track.

Xfinity Series
Waltz began his NASCAR career in a one race deal driving the No. 70 Chevrolet Camaro for Derrike Cope Racing at Richmond International Raceway in fall 2015, Waltz's first race with live pit stops. He started 37th and finished 33rd after retiring with electrical issues and a lap penalty for pitting too early. He attempted another race later in the season with DCR, at Phoenix International Raceway, but failed to qualify. The relationship stemmed from a chance encounter with Cope and his team at the spring Richmond race, which led to Waltz driving the Cope hauler to Iowa Speedway for the race there. In return, Cope gave Waltz the ride at Richmond. 

In 2016, Waltz debuted with Obaika Racing at New Hampshire Motor Speedway, qualifying 39th and finishing 28th. Two races later at Iowa Speedway, rear gear problems dropped him to a 35th-place finish. Waltz then ran four races for Obaika in the Xfinity Series Chase, finishing no higher than 34th.

After the 2016 season, Waltz returned to late model racing because of inadequate sponsorship and did not compete in a NASCAR race in 2017.

Retirement 
In early 2018, Waltz announced his retirement from full-time racing due to a number of factors, mainly a lack of opportunities to advance, a want of more free time, and spending more time running his family business. He did, however, come out of retirement to attempt the 2019 ValleyStar Credit Union 300.

Personal life
Waltz is an Old Dominion University graduate with a Mechanical Engineering degree, racing while attending classes.

Motorsports career results

NASCAR
(key) (Bold – Pole position awarded by qualifying time. Italics – Pole position earned by points standings or practice time. * – Most laps led.)

Xfinity Series

 Season still in progress
 Ineligible for series points

References

External links
 

NASCAR drivers
1989 births
Living people
Sportspeople from Newport News, Virginia
Racing drivers from Virginia